Eddie Bayers (born January 28, 1949) is an American session drummer who has played on 300 gold and platinum albums. He received the Academy of Country Music 'Drummer of the Year Award' for fourteen years, has three times won the Nashville Music Awards 'Drummer of the Year,' and was inducted into the Musicians Hall of Fame and Museum in 2019.  He was also a member of two bands: The Players, and The Notorious Cherry Bombs. In 2022, Bayers was one of four inductees into the Country Music Hall of Fame along with Ray Charles, The Judds, and Pete Drake.

Early life
The son of a career military man, Bayers moved around as a child, originally from Maryland then spending time in Nashville, North Africa, Oakland, and Philadelphia.  His early musical training was as a classical pianist studying Bach, Beethoven, and Mozart. During his college years in Oakland, California he was a member of the Edwin Hawkins Singers and he also jammed with future stars Jerry Garcia, and Tom and John Fogerty and developed an appreciation for the creative aspects of music.  After a short stint in a New Jersey show band he decided to move to Nashville.

Session work
Arriving in Nashville in 1973, Bayers became the house keyboard player at the Carousel Club where he met drummer Larrie Londin who inspired him to take up drumming. His drumming was influenced by soul drummers such as Al Jackson, Jr. and Clyde Stubblefield. He became the staff drummer at Audio Media Studios along with guitarist Paul Worley, keyboardist Dennis Burnside, and bassist Jack Jackson. Some of the artists Bayers has worked with include Tanya Tucker, Mindy Smith, John Denver, Ricky Skaggs and George Strait. 
He has since worked with the likes of The Beach Boys, Garth Brooks, Glen Campbell, Kenny Chesney, Peter Frampton, Vince Gill, Rebecca Lynn Howard, Lane Brody, Julio Iglesias, Alan Jackson, Elton John, Mark Knopfler, Uncle Kracker, Bob Seger, Sting, Steve Winwood, and Trisha Yearwood. He also co- produced Rosanne Cash's album Interiors, A Glen Campbell Christmas, and the soundtrack for A Thing Called Love.

Bands

The Players
In 2002, Bayers formed a band, The Players, with fellow studio musicians Brent Mason, Paul Franklin, John Hobbs, Michael Rhodes. The group released a live DVD, Live in Nashville, featuring their own performances along with guest appearances by Peter Frampton, Shawn Colvin, Travis Tritt, Vince Gill, and Jim Horn.

The Notorious Cherry Bombs
Bayers replaced his former mentor, drummer Larrie Londin, in a reunited Notorious Cherry Bombs for a 2003 ASCAP Country Awards dinner.  The band decided to stay together and has released The Notorious Cherry Bombs which was nominated for Grammies in both the 'Best Country Performance By A Duo Or Group With Vocal' and 'Best Country Song' categories.  Along with Bayers the band consists of Vince Gill, Rodney Crowell, Hank DeVito, Richard Bennett, and Michael Rhodes.

The Medallion Band
An all-star lineup was assembled to be the backing band at the 2010 Country Music Hall of Fame induction ceremony dubbed the Medallion Band.  Bayers served as drummer and was accompanied by keyboardist and music director John Hobbs,  pedal steel player Paul Franklin, electric guitarist Steve Gibson, bassist Michael Rhodes, fiddler Deanie Richardson, tuba player Larry Paxton, background vocalists Dawn Sears and Jeff White, and acoustic guitarist Biff Watson. Later that year Bayers and a slightly revamped Medallion Band accompanied Shawn Camp in honoring Hall of Fame inductee Jimmy Dean. Bayers played the same role for the 2011 Country Music Hall of Fame induction ceremony with the band now dubbed the Medallion All-Stars.

Accolades
Eddie Bayers was inducted into the Musicians Hall of Fame and Museum in 2019. Bayers received the 'Academy of Country Music Drummer of the Year Award' 14 times, 'Nashville Music Awards Drummer of the Year' three times, and one of the 10 greatest session drummers of all time by Drum! magazine. He has been nominated for the 'CMA Musician of the Year' ten times but has yet to bring home the prize. 
On May 1, 2022, he was inducted into the Country Music Hall of Fame.

Music industry
In addition to his work as a musician, Bayers has contributed to the recording industry as a 12-year member of the Board of Governors for NARAS.  He is also the part-owner of the Money Pit recording studio. The No. 1 singles "What I Really Meant to Say" by Cyndi Thomson and "Blessed" by Martina McBride were both recorded at his studio.

Selected discography

References

External links 
 
 
 Eddie Bayers Interview NAMM Oral History Library (2019)

1949 births
American country drummers
American session musicians
Living people
Country musicians from Maryland
The Notorious Cherry Bombs members
20th-century American drummers
American male drummers
20th-century American male musicians